Aubin Pierre Joseph Long (born 20 March 1997) is a French professional footballer who plays as a goalkeeper.

Club career
Long made his professional debut with Sochaux in a 0–0 Ligue 2 tie with SM Caen on 26 July 2019, holding a clean sheet in his debut.

References

External links
 
 
 

1997 births
Living people
People from Nyons
French footballers
Association football goalkeepers
FC Sochaux-Montbéliard players
Ligue 2 players
Championnat National 2 players
Championnat National 3 players
Sportspeople from Drôme
Footballers from Auvergne-Rhône-Alpes